Mauro Canal (born 25 June 1986), is a Brazilian born, Italian futsal player who plays for Pescara and the Italian national futsal team.

References

External links
UEFA profile

1986 births
Living people
Brazilian emigrants to Italy
Italian men's futsal players